Ptilophyllum is an extinct form genus of leaves belonging to the extinct seed plant order Bennettitales. The leaves, like other Bennettitales morphogenera are generally pinnate. Leaves possibly attributable to the genus are known from the Oligocene of Australia, which may be the last known representatives of the order.

References 

Prehistoric plant genera
Bennettitales
Triassic plants
Jurassic plants
Cretaceous plants
Fossil taxa described in 1840
Prehistoric plants of North America